Ricky Helton Wilson (March 19, 1953 – October 12, 1985) was an American musician best known as the original guitarist and founding member of rock band the B-52's. Born in Athens, Georgia, Wilson was the brother of fellow member Cindy Wilson. The B-52's were founded in 1976, when Ricky, Cindy, Kate Pierson, Keith Strickland and Fred Schneider shared a tropical flaming volcano drink at a Chinese restaurant and, after an impromptu music session at the home of their friend Owen Scott III, played for the first time at a Valentine's Day party for friends. Wilson's unusual guitar tunings were a large contribution to the band's quirky sound.

On October 12, 1985, at the age of 32, Wilson died from complications related to AIDS following the recording of the band's fourth studio album Bouncing Off the Satellites. According to Strickland, the album had been completed and mixed before Wilson's death, with only the cover art not yet designed (an illustration by Kenny Scharf was ultimately decided upon). Devastated, the band went into seclusion and did not tour to promote the album, though they did several photo shoots and TV appearances and filmed a video for "Girl from Ipanema Goes to Greenland".

In addition to his work with the B-52's, Wilson played the guitar on the song "Breakin' in My Heart" on Tom Verlaine's self-titled debut album in 1979. This was his only non-B-52's appearance on record. He also appeared in various films, notably One Trick Pony. Posthumously, he also appeared in Athens, GA: Inside/Out, The B-52's 1979–1989, and The B-52's Time Capsule: Videos for a Future Generation 1979–1998 through archival footage.

Early life
Wilson was born on March 19, 1953 to Bobby Jack Wilson, a fireman and a veteran of the United States Army, and Linda J. Wilson (née Mairholtz), in Athens, Georgia. He was the elder brother of Cindy Wilson. At an early age, Wilson developed an interest in music and learned how to play folk guitar from the NET series Learning Folk Guitar. Upon entering Clarke Central High School, Wilson had upgraded to a Silvertone guitar and, to tape his music, purchased a two-track tape recorder with money earned from a summer job at the local landfill.

In mid-1969, Wilson met former Comer resident Keith Strickland at the local head shop The Looking Glass. The two shared common interests in music and Eastern mysticist culture and quickly became friends.

Wilson quietly came out as gay to Strickland while the two were in their teens, becoming the first member of the band to do so.

Musical career

1970–1976: Black Narcissus
During mid-1969, both Wilson and Strickland collaborated in writing and performing music, loosely calling themselves Loon, and aspired to perform live.

From 1969 to 1971, Wilson and Strickland collaborated with high school friends Pete Love of Louisville and Athens native Owen Scott, III in performing together as the four-member band Black Narcissus.

Upon graduation from the University of Georgia in 1976, Wilson kept in touch with Strickland and they toured Europe, eventually returning and taking jobs at the Southeastern Stages bus station in Athens, Georgia where Strickland's father was the manager.

1976–1985: The B-52's
In late 1976, Strickland and Wilson returned to Athens in search of further employment. The two joined the B-52's when they, Wilson's sister Cindy, Kate Pierson, and Fred Schneider of local protest band the Sun-Donuts, formed the group in an impromptu musical practice session after sharing a tropical flaming volcano drink at a Chinese restaurant. They played their first concert in 1977 at a Valentine's Day party for friends. The band's quirky take on the new wave sound of their era was a combination of dance and surf music set apart by the unusual guitar tunings used by Wilson.

Wilson cited various children's records, the Mamas & the Papas, and Esquerita and the Voola as sources of inspiration in his musical career. Wilson also played the guitar on the song "Breakin' In My Heart" on Tom Verlaine's self-titled debut album.

Illness and death
In 1983, during recording sessions for the band's third studio album Whammy!, Wilson discovered he had contracted HIV. He confided his illness to Keith Strickland, as stated in several interviews including one with The Age. In 1985, during recording for their album Bouncing Off the Satellites, Wilson's illness became more severe; both Strickland and Pierson have stated that despite this, he kept his illness secret from the other members of the band. In an interview, Pierson stated that Wilson did so because he "did not want anyone to worry about him or fuss about him".

On October 12, 1985, in the Memorial Sloan–Kettering Cancer Center, Wilson died of AIDS, at the age of 32. He was buried in Oconee Hill Cemetery in Athens. Devastated, the band did little promotional work and did not tour to promote the album. Upon reforming in 1988, the band continued as a four-piece, with Strickland replicating Wilson's riffs from their earlier material in live performances.

References

Johnson, Chad.  CliffsNotes to Guitar Songs.  Milwaukee, WI:  Hal Leonard, 2014.    
Perone, James E.   The Album: A Guide to Pop Music's Most Provocative, Influential, and Important Creations, 4 Volumes.  Santa Barbara, CA:  ABC-CLIO, 2012.

Simmonds, Jeremy.  The Encyclopedia of Dead Rock Stars: Heroin, Handguns, and Ham Sandwiches.  Chicago, IL:  Chicago Review Press, 2012. 
Various Mojo Magazine.  The Mojo Collection: 4th Edition.  Edinburgh, UK:  Canongate Books, 2007.
Ricky Wilson (B-52's), Danelectro Dano Pro Electric Guitar from Equipboard.com. Ricky Wilson (B-52's)'s Danelectro Dano Pro Electric Guitar.
Ricky Wilson and the Rock Lobster from Legacy.com.

External links 
 
 Washington Post Article about Ricky Wilson's Grave

1953 births
1985 deaths
20th-century American guitarists
20th-century American male singers
20th-century American singers
AIDS-related deaths in New York (state)
Gay singers
Gay songwriters
American male guitarists
American new wave musicians
American post-punk musicians
American rock guitarists
American rock singers
American rock songwriters
Burials in Georgia (U.S. state)
American gay musicians
Guitarists from Georgia (U.S. state)
LGBT people from Georgia (U.S. state)
American LGBT singers
American LGBT songwriters
Lead guitarists
Musicians from Athens, Georgia
Songwriters from Georgia (U.S. state)
The B-52's members
University of Georgia alumni
20th-century American LGBT people
American gay writers